Pind Kamal Khan is one of the 44 union councils, administrative subdivisions, of Haripur District in the Khyber Pakhtunkhwa province of Pakistan.
It is a mountainous valley with two lakes, Mang and Kahl lakes.

References

Union councils of Haripur District